Lignocarpa is a genus of flowering plants belonging to the family Apiaceae.

Its native range is New Zealand.

Species:

Lignocarpa carnosula 
Lignocarpa diversifolia

References

Apioideae
Taxa named by John Dawson (botanist)
Apioideae genera